Ptychobela suturalis is a species of sea snail, a marine gastropod mollusk in the family Pseudomelatomidae, the turrids and allies.

Description
The length of the shell attains 40 mm, its diameter 12.8 mm.

Distribution
This marine species was found off Hainan Island, China.

References

 Gray, J.E. 1838. On some new species of quadrupeds and shells. Annals of Natural History 1 1: 27-30
 Kiener, L.C. 1839–1840. Genre Pleurotome (Pleurotoma Lam.). 1-84, pls 1–27 in Spécies général et Iconographie des coquilles vivantes, comprenant la collection du Muséum d'histoire Naturelle de Paris, la collection de Lamarck, celle du Prince Massena (appartenant maintenant a M. le Baron B. Delessert) et les découvertes récentes des voyageurs. Paris : Rousseau Vol. 5.
 Reeve, L.A. 1843. Monograph of the genus Pleurotoma. pls 1–18 in Reeve, L.A. (ed.). Conchologica Iconica. London : L. Reeve & Co. Vol. 1.
 Leung KF. & Morton B. (2003). Effects of long-term anthropogenic perturbations on three subtidal epibenthic molluscan communities in Hong Kong. In: Morton B, editor. Proceedings of an International Workshop Reunion Conference, Hong Kong: Perspectives on Marine Environment Change in Hong Kong and Southern China, 1977–2001. Hong Kong University Press, Hong Kong. pp 655–717.

External links
 Gastropods.com: Ptychobela suturalis
 
  Baoquan Li 李宝泉 & R.N. Kilburn, Report on Crassispirinae Morrison, 1966 (Mollusca: Neogastropoda: Turridae) from the China Seas; Journal of Natural History 44(11):699-740 · March 2010; DOI: 10.1080/00222930903470086
  Liu J.Y. [Ruiyu] (ed.). (2008). Checklist of marine biota of China seas. China Science Press. 1267 pp.

suturalis
Gastropods described in 1838
Taxa named by John Edward Gray